Philip Mitchell Baron (born May 10, 1949) is an American voice actor, puppeteer and songwriter who voiced Piglet in the Disney Channel live-action/puppet television series Welcome to Pooh Corner. He was also the voice of the title character in the popular Teddy Ruxpin toy-line and voiced Teddy Ruxpin again, as well as other characters, in the 1987 animated television show The Adventures of Teddy Ruxpin. He also created and voiced some characters in The Adventures of Timmy the Tooth in the mid-1990s. He also had a very successful career in music, as half of the comedy/music duo, Willio and Phillio with Will Ryan, and including a stint as an exec for Rhino Records and a successful songwriter, including songs written and performed (often with Ryan) for Disney children's titles. He also wrote songs for Sesame Street and was an additional puppeteer on Muppets Tonight.

He has become a cantor and serves in this capacity at Valley Beth Shalom synagogue in the San Fernando Valley in Los Angeles, California.

Filmography

Film

Television

Footnotes

External links

1949 births
Living people
Jewish American male actors
American male voice actors
Jewish American artists
Jewish American writers
Hazzans
21st-century American Jews